Paracles brunnea is a moth of the subfamily Arctiinae first described by Jacob Hübner in 1831. It is found in Brazil, Argentina and Patagonia.

References

Moths described in 1831
Paracles